Mentor Court is a bungalow court located at 937 E. California Blvd. in Pasadena, California. The buildings are designed in the English Cottage Revival style and feature jerkinhead roofs, arched doors with glass paneling, and a stoop at each entrance covered by an eyebrow hood. The Delux Building company built the court in 1923.

The court was added to the National Register of Historic Places on November 15, 1994.

References

External links

Bungalow courts
Houses in Pasadena, California
Houses completed in 1923
Houses on the National Register of Historic Places in California
National Register of Historic Places in Pasadena, California
Historic districts on the National Register of Historic Places in California